Rāhu (Sanskrit: राहु) is one of the nine major celestial bodies (navagraha) in Hindu texts and the king of meteors. It represents the ascension of the moon in its precessional orbit around the earth, also referred as the north lunar node, and along with Ketu, is a "shadow planet" that causes eclipses. Despite having no physical existence, Rahu has been allocated the status of the planet by ancient seers owing to its strong influence in astrology.

Rahu is usually paired with Ketu, another shadow planet. The time of day considered to be under the influence of Rahu is called Rāhu kāla and is considered inauspicious.

As per Hindu astrology, Rahu and Ketu have an orbital cycle of 18 years and are always 180 degrees from each other orbitally (as well as in the birth charts). This coincides with the precessional orbit of the moon or the ~18 year rotational cycle of the lunar ascending and descending nodes on the earth's ecliptic plane. This also corresponds to a saros, a period of approximately 223 synodic months (approximately 6585.3211 days, or 18 years, 11 days, 8 hours), that can be used to predict eclipses of the Sun and Moon. Rahu rules the zodiac sign of Aquarius together with Shani.

Astronomically, Rahu and Ketu denote the points of intersection of the paths of the Sun and the Moon as they move on the celestial sphere. Therefore, Rahu and Ketu are respectively called the north and the south lunar nodes. Eclipses occur when the Sun and the Moon are at one of these points, giving rise to the understanding of swallowing of the Sun and the Moon by the snake. Rahu is responsible for causing the Eclipse of the Sun.

Legends 

Rahu is mentioned in the Puranic texts. The tales begin in the "remotest periods of the earliest of time, when the devas and asuras churned the ocean of milk to extract from it the amrita, the elixir of immortality." Mohini, the female avatar of Vishnu, started distributing amrita to the devas. However, one of the asuras, Svarbhanu, sat in the row of devas and drank the amrita. Surya and Chandra noticed him and they informed Mohini; however, by that time, Svarbhanu had already become immortal. Vishnu, as Mohini, cut off Svarbhanu's head with the Sudarshana Chakra. Svarbhanu, henceforth referred to as Rahuketu, could not die, but his head was separated from his body and his head came to be known as Rahu, while his body came to be known as Ketu. Following this event, Rahu and Ketu were given the responsibility to influence the lives of the humans on Earth.

Astrology 
Since Rahu and Ketu are two opposite lunar nodes, they always appear in diametrically opposite houses in horoscopes. Both nodes are always in retrograde motion.

In Hindu astrology, Rahu represents materialism, mischief, fear, dissatisfaction, obsession and confusion. Rahu is also associated with politicians and occult sciences. Like Ketu, Rahu is also an enemy against the sun and moon. It is generally considered as a malefic planet in astrology.

Jyotisha is Hindu astrology, which entails the concepts of Nakshatra (see also List of Natchathara temples), Navagraha (see also List of Navagraha temples), and Saptarishi (included in the list of Hindu deities whose dedicated temples are found at various Hindu pilgrimage sites to which Hindus take yatra).

Buddhist culture 
Rāhu is mentioned explicitly in a pair of scriptures from the Samyutta Nikaya of the Pali Canon. In the Candima Sutta and the Suriya Sutta, Rahu attacks Surya, the Sun deity and Chandra, the Moon deity before being compelled to release them by their recitation of a brief stanza conveying their reverence for the Buddha.  The Buddha responds by enjoining Rāhu to release them, which Rāhu does rather than have his "head split into seven pieces". The verses recited by the two celestial deities and the Buddha have since been incorporated into Buddhist liturgy as protective verses recited by monks as prayers of protection.

Gallery

See also
Ketu
Kirtimukha
Svarbhanu
Saros
Orbital node
Batara Kala

Notes

External links

Asura
Danavas
Navagraha
Planetary deities
Sun myths
Moon myths
Eclipses
History of astrology
Hindu gods
Dharmapalas